Halfway Home is an American comedy series that aired on Comedy Central in the spring of 2007. After airing 10 episodes, on June 20, 2007 costar Regan Burns confirmed that the show had ended.

On its official website, Halfway Home is described as an "improvised half-hour show featuring the daily exploits of five ex-cons living together in a residential rehab facility" (the fictional Crenshaw Halfway House, in Los Angeles, California).

Characters
 Carly Barzac (played by Jessica Makinson) is an ex-convict for drug trafficking. She has a bad relationship with her parents (they screen her calls), and had to hire actors to pretend to be her parents on Parents' Day. She has set the world record for pogo-sticking. Carly's years of drug use have severely hindered her cognitive abilities, leaving her ditzy and, according to an online intelligence test, "mildly retarded." When she goes sober her IQ skyrockets; this led to her gaining the highest score ever on the GED test in the state of California.  Unfortunately, this also leaves her irritable and violent, to the point where giving her more pot becomes the only option.
Kenny Carlyle (played by Kevin Ruf) is the house supervisor. He is the stereotypical sensitive counselor who enforces the rules, while being known to break them on occasion. He has "no formal training regarding rehabilitation or psychology." He has apparently been working at the Crenshaw Halfway House for fifteen years. Kenny hopes to pursue a musical career but lacks the talent.
Serenity Johnson (played by Octavia Spencer) is an ex-convict for armed robbery. She is very aggressive and hostile, threatening other housemates with violence, no matter what terms she is on with them. She has a troubled relationship with her mother, a beautician. She had aspirations of fame when she was interviewed for a television show, only to later discover the show was "America's Stupidest Criminals."
 Eulogio Pla (played by Oscar Nunez) was convicted for prostitution; his prison file describes him as "[using] sex to get what he wants." He comes from a very long line of prostitutes and is the only one in the family to have been arrested, a fact his father is deeply ashamed of. Eulogio seems to have some skills as a beautician.  He fixes Carly's hair after Alan burns half of it off and, also, gives Del's delinquent nephew, Hubble a near-complete makeover.
Alan Shepard (played by Regan Burns) is an ex-convict for arson, described as "the house narc who has an "uncontrollable obsession with fire". Alan married a woman after she lied and told him she was pregnant (she didn't become pregnant until two years after they had been married). They have five daughters, though according to him his "relationship with all of them is somewhat stressed at the moment, but you try living in a house with 6 females, all of whom constantly put you down as a man. Always belittling everything about you, including the size of your penis. I hate when they visit." Stemming from his wildly intolerant father, Shepard has been shown to have many bigoted beliefs, once stating, "I normally don't have anything against the gays and the dark skinned peoples of the world, but I don't want to live with them. And by live with them, I mean share the same zip code.". At times, though, he will try to get along with the other housemates, to varying degrees of success. He considers Kenny to be his best friend and thinks of himself as Kenny's second in command.
Sebastian "C-Bass" Yates (played by Jordan Black) is an ex-convict for internet fraud. A computer hacker and a Muslim described as a "wanna-be terrorist who's really just a rich kid from Calabasas." He comes from a wealthy family and misses being in the Accelerated Computer Sciences program at Pepperdine University in Malibu. He is prejudiced against whites and sees himself as fighting for black rights (though he complains more than taking any action). He is on the rape list at prison and was suspected of being a virgin upon entering prison.

Episodes
Episodes are listed in the order of the date they aired, which does not necessarily coincide with the order in which they were produced (as indicated by the production codes listed).

References

External links
 
 

Comedy Central original programming
2007 American television series debuts
2007 American television series endings
2000s American sitcoms
English-language television shows
Improvisational television series